George Washington Hulick (June 29, 1833 – August 13, 1907) was a teacher, lawyer, soldier, judge, and a two-term U.S. Representative from Ohio from 1893 to 1897.

Biography
Born in Batavia, Ohio, Hulick attended the public schools and graduated from Farmer's College, near Cincinnati. He took charge of Pleasant Hill Academy and taught two years. Hulick then studied law and was admitted to the bar in 1857. He subsequently commenced his law practice in Batavia.

Civil War 
During the Civil War, he enlisted as a private in Company E, Twenty-second Regiment, Ohio Volunteer Infantry on April 14, 1861. He was appointed as an orderly sergeant and afterward was elected as the captain of his company. Hulick was discharged August 16, 1861, when the regiment's three-month term of enlistment expired.

Political career 
He then served as the probate judge of Clermont County, Ohio, from 1864–1867, and served nine years on the board of education. He served as delegate to the Republican National Convention in 1868.

Presidential elector for Hayes/Wheeler in 1876.

Hulick was elected as a Republican to the Fifty-third and Fifty-fourth Congresses (March 4, 1893 – March 3, 1897). He was an unsuccessful candidate for renomination in 1896.

He then resumed the practice of law in Batavia.

Death
He died in Batavia on August 13, 1907, and was interred in Union Cemetery.

See also

References
 Retrieved on 2008-10-13

1833 births
1907 deaths
People from Batavia, Ohio
Union Army officers
Ohio lawyers
1876 United States presidential electors
People of Ohio in the American Civil War
19th-century American politicians
Republican Party members of the United States House of Representatives from Ohio